Diary of a Jewish Muslim is a 2014 book by Egyptian author Kamal Ruhayyim.

It constitutes the first part of the "Galal trilogy", dealing with the life of Galal, an Egyptian boy with a Muslim father and a Jewish mother and spanning the 1930s to the 1960s.

This book was translated into English by Sarah Enany and published by AUC Press, a translation that was nominated for the Banipal Prize.

References

2014 novels
Egyptian novels
Jewish Egyptian history
Islam and Judaism